Capitaspis is an extinct genus of cyathaspidine cyathaspidid heterostracan jawless vertebrate known from the Late Silurian Somerset Island Formation (Pridolian epoch) of the Northwest Territories, Canada. It contains a single species, Capitaspis giblingi. It is most closely related to Pionaspis.

References

Cyathaspidiformes genera
Monotypic fish genera
Fossil taxa described in 2013
Cyathaspidida
Silurian jawless fish
Fossils of Canada
Paleontology in the Northwest Territories